Fire manipulation may refer to:

 Fire performance, a group of performance arts or skills that involve the manipulation of fire
 Pyrokinesis, the purported psychic ability allowing a person to create and control fire with the mind